Corinth is an unincorporated community in Oconee County, South Carolina, United States, located  east-northeast of Seneca.

Notes

Unincorporated communities in Oconee County, South Carolina
Unincorporated communities in South Carolina